La Dina Fault is a regional dextral oblique thrust fault in the departments of Huila and Tolima in southwestern Colombia.

Description 
La Dina Fault lies east of La Plata Fault in southwestern Colombia. The fault displaces Jurassic (Saldaña Formation), Cretaceous (Chicoral and Olini Groups), and Tertiary (Honda Group) sedimentary rocks, which are common in the Upper Magdalena Valley. Local names assigned to the southern extension of this fault are from north to south: Betania, Pital-Agredo and Magdalena. It is also called the El Agrado-Betania Fault in Huila, where it underlies the Betania Reservoir. The fault is marked by well-developed trace, abrupt slope changes, saddles, and small scarps.

See also 

 List of earthquakes in Colombia
 Garzón-Pitalito Fault
 La Plata Fault

References

Bibliography

Maps 
 
 

Seismic faults of Colombia
Thrust faults
Strike-slip faults
Inactive faults
Faults
Faults
Faults